Moksha is a 2001 Indian crime drama film produced and directed by Ashok Mehta in his directorial debut. The film stars Arjun Rampal and Manisha Koirala. The film won Best Cinematography and Best Audiography at 48th National Film Awards.

Plot
The story revolves around Vikram Saigal, a law graduate who is dissatisfied with his current situation. He is an idealist and aspires to fight against corruption and societal issues to make a change in the world. Hritika, a young girl, is enamored with him and tries to win his heart. At first, Vikram rejects her advances, but after she presents him with an expensive painting, they become a couple.

Vikram's idealism leads him to want to establish a free legal service for the poor. However, he finds it difficult to find like-minded lawyers to support his cause. His father and boss think he is too young and naive to understand the ramifications of providing free legal services, and he becomes more disillusioned. Eventually, he plans to rob a bank to obtain the money needed to establish his free legal institute.

Together with Hritika, Vikram hatches a plot to rob a bank. However, Hritika has a change of heart and persuades Vikram to abandon the plan. On the day of the planned robbery, an informant alerts the bank authorities, causing them to be on high alert.

Hritika is found dead shortly after, and all signs point to Vikram. A courtroom battle ensues, with Vikram representing himself. After the verdict, Hritika's best friend reveals that she, not Hritika, was the informant who alerted the bank. Overcome with guilt, Vikram attempts to take his own life but is unable to do so. He decides to rob the bank again, this time with an unloaded gun. He enters the bank with the intention of sacrificing himself, and ultimately dies from a fatal gunshot wound.

Cast
Arjun Rampal as Vikram Saigal
Manisha Koirala as Hritika Sanyal
Naseeruddin Shah as Dean
Kalpana Pandit as Neelima, Ritika's roommate.
Suresh Oberoi as Mr. Saigal, Vikram's father.
Shubhangi Gokhale as Mrs Saigal, Vikram's mother.
Paresh Rawal as Sharan Mama, Vikram's maternal uncle.
Sushma Seth as Naani Maa, Ritika's maternal grandmother.
Danny Denzongpa as Bachelor Simon
Farida Jalal as Salim's mother
Mohan Gokhale as Behram
Kiran Kumar as Head lawyer
Saurabh Shukla as office peon Kale
Gulshan Grover as Prosecutor Mehra
Archana Puran Singh as Landlady Mrs D'Souza
Sulabha Deshpande as eyewitness
Kamal Chopra as rich guy

Soundtrack
All tracks was composed by Rajesh Roshan and lyrics penned by Javed Akhtar. Duo composer Salim–Sulaiman had provided four instrumental tracks for this album. The full album was released on 9 September 2001.

Reception

Box office
The film was a box-office bomb, grossing  8.2 million against a  50 million production budget. Film trade analyst Taran Adarsh believed that circulation of pirated VCDs much before the film's theatrical release hampered its box-office prospects greatly.

Critical response
Writing for Bollywood Hungama, Taran Adarsh gave the film one star saying "On the whole, MOKSHA is a dry and dull film that won't find flavour with the audience. Besides, the pirated VCDs have been in circulation much before the film's theatrical release, which will hamper its box-office prospects greatly." He praised Anil Mehta's cinematography and Rampal's performance saying "Arjun Rampal excels in a role avalibility that was difficult to portray. He takes giant strides as a performer and proves that he's an actor with an amazing range." Priyanka Bhattacharya of Rediff.com called it "Arjun's 70 mm portfolio!" by stating "Moksha was supposed to be Arjun Rampal's debut film. The director has taken special care to present it just that way. The camera has focused on Arjun the way a painter would on his muse. In that sense, Moksha is more a 70-mm portfolio for Arjun Rampal than a story."

Awards
Ashok Mehta won National Film Award for Best Cinematography at 48th National Film Awards, the jury stated "For providing wide range of tonal variation and outstanding compositions to cater to the changing moods of the film's narrative." The film also won Best Audiography award.

References

External links

2001 films
2000s Hindi-language films
Indian crime thriller films
Indian legal drama films
Films whose cinematographer won the Best Cinematography National Film Award
Films scored by Rajesh Roshan
Films scored by Salim–Sulaiman
Films that won the Best Audiography National Film Award
2001 directorial debut films
2001 crime thriller films